Cindy Perros (born 7 February 1990) is a French kickboxer and the current ISKA World super lightweight and light welterweight Freestyle kickboxing champion, as well as the former European light welterweight Freestyle champion.

Kickboxing career
Perros faced Johanna Kruse for the vacant ISKA European light welterweight Freestyle at Explosion Fight Night 8 on November 16, 2013. She captured the title by unanimous decision. Perros made her ISKA European title defense against Lisa Schewe at La Nuit des Titans on May 31, 2014. She retained the title by unanimous decision.

Perros challenged Angélique Pitiot for the FFSCDA Light Welterweight (-64.5 kg) title at Choc Des Titans 5 on June 14, 2014. She lost the fight by unanimous decision, moving her score against Pitiot to 0-2, having first lost to her at FK-ONE on April 20, 2013.

Perros bounced back from her second loss by going went on a three fight winning streak. She first beat Laurie Catherin by a fifth-round technical knockout at Ceinture Lahouari Othmane on June 11, 2016. In the second fight of her win streak, Perros won a unanimous decision against Mathilde Contreras at Elite Fight IV on May 13, 2017. Perros extended the win streak to three consecutive fights with a unanimous decision victory over Clara Asensio at Elite Fight V on February 3, 2018.

Perros faced Laurie Catherin in a rematch at Championnat De France Pro K1 Rules / Full Contact / Low Kick on June 5, 2018. She won the fight by unanimous decision. Perros made her first ISKA World Freestyle Kickboxing title defense against Anke Van Gestel at Gal Kickboxing on June 9, 2018. She won the fight by unanimous decision. The pair fought at immediate rematch, with Van Gestel's ISKA World Light Welterweight (-64.5 kg) K-1 title on the line, at Prime Time 9 on November 24, 2018. She lost the fight by unanimous decision.

Perros faced Maurine Atef at Elite Fight VI on January 18, 2019. She won the fight by unanimous decision. Perros faced Alissia Greco for the ISKA World Super Lightweight (-62.5 kg) Freestyle title at K-Fight 4 on June 22, 2019. She won the fight by a third-round technical knockout.

Perros faced Aurore Llorens at Ultimate Fight Night 10 on January 20, 2023. She lost the fight by decision.

Championships and accomplishments
International Sport Karate Association
ISKA European Light Welterweight (-64.5 kg) Freestyle Championship
ISKA World Light Welterweight (-64.5 kg) Freestyle Championship
Two successful title defenses
ISKA World Super Lightweight (-62.5 kg) Freestyle Championship
Fédération Française de Kick Boxing, Muaythaï et Disciplines Associées
FFKMDA National Light Welterweight (-64.5 kg) Championship

Kickboxing record

|-  bgcolor="#FFBBBB"
| 2023-01-20 || Loss ||align=left| Aurore Llorens || Ultimate Fight Night 10 || Brest, France || Decision || 3 || 3:00
|-
|-  bgcolor="#CCFFCC"
| 2020-01-17 || Win||align=left| Alessia Collochia || Ultimate Fight Night || Brest, France || Decision (Unanimous) || 3 || 3:00 
|-
|-  bgcolor="#CCFFCC"
| 2019-06-22 || Win||align=left| Alissia Greco || K-Fight 4 || Sainte-Luce-sur-Loire, France || TKO (Punches and kicks) || 3 ||  
|-
! style=background:white colspan=9 |
|-
|-  bgcolor="#CCFFCC"
| 2019-01-18 || Win||align=left| Maurine Atef || Elite Fight VI || Saint-Brieuc, France || Decision (Unanimous) || 3 || 3:00 
|-
|-  bgcolor="#FFBBBB"
| 2018-11-24 || Loss||align=left| Anke Van Gestel || Prime Time 9 || Merchtem, Belgium || Decision (Unanimous) || 5 || 3:00 
|-
! style=background:white colspan=9 |
|-
|-  bgcolor="#CCFFCC"
| 2018-06-09 || Win||align=left| Anke Van Gestel || Gal Kickboxing || Quimperlé, France || Decision (Unanimous) || 5 || 3:00 
|-
! style=background:white colspan=9 |
|-
|-  bgcolor="#CCFFCC"
| 2018-05-06 || Win||align=left| Laurie Catherin || Championnat De France Pro K1 Rules / Full Contact / Low Kick || Villepinte, France || Decision (Unanimous) || 5 || 3:00 
|-
! style=background:white colspan=9 |
|-
|-  bgcolor="#CCFFCC"
| 2018-02-03 || Win||align=left| Clara Asensio || Elite Fight V || Saint-Brieuc, France || Decision (Unanimous) || 3 || 3:00 
|-
|-  bgcolor="#CCFFCC"
| 2017-05-13 || Win||align=left| Mathilde Contreras || Elite Fight IV || Ploufragan, France || Decision (Unanimous) || 3 || 3:00 
|-
|-  bgcolor="#CCFFCC"
| 2016-06-11 || Win||align=left| Laurie Catherin || Ceinture Lahouari Othmane || Quimperlé, France || TKO (Punches) || 5 ||  
|-
|-  bgcolor="#FFBBBB"
| 2014-06-14 || Loss||align=left| Angélique Pitiot || Choc Des Titans 5 || Le Lamentin, France || Decision (Unanimous) || 5 || 3:00 
|-
! style=background:white colspan=9 |
|-
|-  bgcolor="#CCFFCC"
| 2014-05-31 || Win||align=left| Lisa Schewe || La Nuit des Titans || Saint-André-les-Vergers, France || Decision (Unanimous) || 5 || 3:00 
|-
! style=background:white colspan=9 |
|-
|-  bgcolor="#CCFFCC"
| 2013-11-16 || Win||align=left| Johanna Kruse || Explosion Fight Night 8 || Brest, France || Decision (Unanimous) || 5 || 3:00 
|-
! style=background:white colspan=9 |
|-
|-  bgcolor="#FFBBBB"
| 2013-04-20 || Loss||align=left| Angélique Pitiot || FK-ONE || Goussainville, France || Decision (Unanimous) || 5 || 3:00 
|-
! style=background:white colspan=9 |
|-
|-  bgcolor="#CCFFCC"
| 2013-03-30 || Win||align=left| Sylvie Declerk || Elite Fight II || Saint-Brieuc, France || TKO (Referee stoppage) || 4 || 
|-
| colspan=9 | Legend:

See also
List of female kickboxers

References 

1990 births
French female kickboxers
Living people